Anti-communist insurgencies continued in Central and Eastern Europe after the end of World War II. They were suppressed by the Soviet Union and its satellite states.

Prominent movements include:
The Ukrainian Insurgent Army fought until they were defeated in 1956
The anti-Soviet Hungarian Revolution took place in 1956
Baltic partisans known as the "Forest Brothers" fought until they were defeated in the early 1960s
Romanian anti-communist resistance movement fought until they were defeated in 1962/68
Polish partisans known as the "cursed soldiers" fought until they were defeated in 1963
Bulgarian partisans known as "Goryani" fought until they were defeated in the early 1960s
Croatian ultra-nationalist insurgents known as "Crusaders" fought until they were defeated in the early 1950s
Chetniks fought until eradicated in the early 1950s
Slovenian partisans fought until they were defeated in the early 1950s
Moldovan and Romanian partisans (fighting the Soviet occupation of Bessarabia and Northern Bukovina) fought until they were defeated in the early 1950s
Some Russian White movement members fought until they were defeated in the 1960s
Belarusian partisans fought until they were defeated in the early 1950s

In Poland

The 'cursed soldiers' (Polish: Żołnierze wyklęci) is a name applied to a variety of Polish resistance movements that were formed in the later stages of World War II and afterward. Created by former members of the Polish underground resistance organizations of World War II, these organizations continued the struggle against the pro-Soviet government of Poland well into the 1950s. Their history and actions have been controversial, as they have been accused of anti-Semitism and mass murder.

Most of these anti-communist groups ceased operations in the late 1940s or 1950s. However, the last known 'cursed soldier', Józef Franczak, was killed in an ambush as late as 1963, almost 20 years after the Soviet take-over of Poland.

In the Baltic States

The Forest Brothers (also: Brothers of the Forest, Forest Brethren; Forest Brotherhood; Estonian: metsavennad, Latvian: meža brāļi, Lithuanian: miško broliai) were Estonian, Latvian, and Lithuanian partisans who waged guerrilla warfare against Soviet rule during the Soviet invasion and occupation of the three Baltic states during, and after, World War II. 
The Soviet Army occupied the independent Baltic states in 1940–1941 and, after a period of German occupation, again in 1944–1945. As Stalinist repression intensified over the following years, 50,000 residents of these countries used the heavily forested countryside as a natural refuge and base for armed anti-Soviet resistance.

Resistance units varied in size and composition, ranging from individually operating guerrillas, armed primarily for self-defense, to large and well-organized groups able to engage significant Soviet forces in battle.

In Romania

An armed resistance movement against the communist regime in Romania was active from the late 40s to the mid-50s, with isolated individual fighters remaining at large until the early 1960s. The groups were concentrated in the Carpathian Mountains, although a resistance movement had also developed in Northern Dobruja. Armed resistance was the most structured form of resistance against the communist regime. After the overthrow of Nicolae Ceauşescu in 1989, the details about what was called “anti-communist armed resistance” were made public, thanks to the discretization of the Securitate archives.

See also
Western betrayal

References

Anti-communism
Eastern Bloc
Cold War rebellions
Anti-communist resistance movements in Eastern Europe
Insurgencies in Europe